Jungshahi (also spelled as Jang Shahi) is a town of Thatta District in the Sindh province of Pakistan. It lies to the east of Karachi at 24°51'26N 67°46'21E and is a Union Council of Thatta tehsil. In 1949 Major General Muhammed Iftikhar Khan, who was due to become the first native commander of the Pakistan army after the retirement of Sir Douglas Gracey, died in an air-crash  near the city.

References

Thatta District